The Balashikha constituency (No.117) is a Russian legislative constituency in Moscow Oblast. The constituency covers northeastern suburbs of Moscow.

Members elected

Election results

1993

|-
! colspan=2 style="background-color:#E9E9E9;text-align:left;vertical-align:top;" |Candidate
! style="background-color:#E9E9E9;text-align:left;vertical-align:top;" |Party
! style="background-color:#E9E9E9;text-align:right;" |Votes
! style="background-color:#E9E9E9;text-align:right;" |%
|-
|style="background-color:"|
|align=left|Andrey Aizderdzis
|align=left|Independent
|
|9.23%
|-
|style="background-color:"|
|align=left|Antonina Savchenko
|align=left|Independent
| -
|8.50%
|-
| colspan="5" style="background-color:#E9E9E9;"|
|- style="font-weight:bold"
| colspan="3" style="text-align:left;" | Total
| 
| 100%
|-
| colspan="5" style="background-color:#E9E9E9;"|
|- style="font-weight:bold"
| colspan="4" |Source:
|
|}

1994

|-
! colspan=2 style="background-color:#E9E9E9;text-align:left;vertical-align:top;" |Candidate
! style="background-color:#E9E9E9;text-align:left;vertical-align:top;" |Party
! style="background-color:#E9E9E9;text-align:right;" |Votes
! style="background-color:#E9E9E9;text-align:right;" |%
|-
|style="background-color:"|
|align=left|Sergey Mavrodi
|align=left|Independent
|-
|27.84%
|-
| colspan="5" style="background-color:#E9E9E9;"|
|- style="font-weight:bold"
| colspan="3" style="text-align:left;" | Total
| -
| 100%
|-
| colspan="5" style="background-color:#E9E9E9;"|
|- style="font-weight:bold"
| colspan="4" |Source:
|
|}

1995

|-
! colspan=2 style="background-color:#E9E9E9;text-align:left;vertical-align:top;" |Candidate
! style="background-color:#E9E9E9;text-align:left;vertical-align:top;" |Party
! style="background-color:#E9E9E9;text-align:right;" |Votes
! style="background-color:#E9E9E9;text-align:right;" |%
|-
|style="background-color:#3A46CE"|
|align=left|Sergey Yushenkov
|align=left|Democratic Choice of Russia – United Democrats
|
|18.47%
|-
|style="background-color:#D50000"|
|align=left|Yury Slobodkin
|align=left|Communists and Working Russia - for the Soviet Union
|
|15.69%
|-
|style="background-color:"|
|align=left|Aleksandr Aleksandrov
|align=left|Independent
|
|10.04%
|-
|style="background-color:#F5A222"|
|align=left|Aleksandr Zaytsev
|align=left|Interethnic Union
|
|6.68%
|-
|style="background-color:"|
|align=left|Boris Nadezhdin
|align=left|Independent
|
|6.04%
|-
|style="background-color:"|
|align=left|Aleksandr Fedorov
|align=left|Russian Party
|
|5.42%
|-
|style="background-color:#1C1A0D"|
|align=left|Vladimir Ponomaryov
|align=left|Forward, Russia!
|
|4.28%
|-
|style="background-color:"|
|align=left|Dmitry Pavlov
|align=left|Independent
|
|3.81%
|-
|style="background-color:"|
|align=left|Vladislav Gorokhov
|align=left|Our Future
|
|3.79%
|-
|style="background-color:"|
|align=left|Fyodor Pugachyov
|align=left|Independent
|
|3.71%
|-
|style="background-color:#FF4400"|
|align=left|Sergey Plevako
|align=left|Party of Workers' Self-Government
|
|3.66%
|-
|style="background-color:"|
|align=left|Vladimir Korobeynikov
|align=left|Zemsky Sobor
|
|1.29%
|-
|style="background-color:#000000"|
|colspan=2 |against all
|
|14.27%
|-
| colspan="5" style="background-color:#E9E9E9;"|
|- style="font-weight:bold"
| colspan="3" style="text-align:left;" | Total
| 
| 100%
|-
| colspan="5" style="background-color:#E9E9E9;"|
|- style="font-weight:bold"
| colspan="4" |Source:
|
|}

1999
A by-election was scheduled after Against all line received the most votes.

|-
! colspan=2 style="background-color:#E9E9E9;text-align:left;vertical-align:top;" |Candidate
! style="background-color:#E9E9E9;text-align:left;vertical-align:top;" |Party
! style="background-color:#E9E9E9;text-align:right;" |Votes
! style="background-color:#E9E9E9;text-align:right;" |%
|-
|style="background-color:"|
|align=left|Vladimir Aristarkhov
|align=left|Independent
|
|14.02%
|-
|style="background-color:"|
|align=left|Nina Berdnikova
|align=left|Communist Party
|
|11.98%
|-
|style="background-color:"|
|align=left|Andrey Karaulov
|align=left|Independent
|
|11.13%
|-
|style="background:#1042A5"| 
|align=left|Andrey Nechayev
|align=left|Union of Right Forces
|
|9.23%
|-
|style="background-color:"|
|align=left|Aleksandr Lukin
|align=left|Independent
|
|8.07%
|-
|style="background-color:"|
|align=left|Gennady Strekalov
|align=left|Independent
|
|6.10%
|-
|style="background-color:#D50000"|
|align=left|Yury Slobodkin
|align=left|Communists and Workers of Russia - for the Soviet Union
|
|6.03%
|-
|style="background-color:"|
|align=left|Dmitry Valigursky
|align=left|Independent
|
|2.94%
|-
|style="background-color:"|
|align=left|Andrey Kuznetsov
|align=left|Independent
|
|2.28%
|-
|style="background-color:"|
|align=left|Anatoly Tishin
|align=left|Independent
|
|2.17%
|-
|style="background-color:"|
|align=left|Mikhail Bezrukov
|align=left|Independent
|
|2.02%
|-
|style="background-color:#084284"|
|align=left|Nadezhda Koldayeva
|align=left|Spiritual Heritage
|
|1.85%
|-
|style="background-color:"|
|align=left|Margarita Zhukova
|align=left|Independent
|
|1.75%
|-
|style="background-color:"|
|align=left|Yury Konov
|align=left|Liberal Democratic Party
|
|1.21%
|-
|style="background-color:"|
|align=left|Aleksandr Vengerovsky
|align=left|Independent
|
|1.06%
|-
|style="background-color:#E32322"|
|align=left|Andrey Zvyagin
|align=left|Stalin Bloc – For the USSR
|
|0.83%
|-
|style="background-color:"|
|align=left|Yury Yegorov
|align=left|Independent
|
|0.38%
|-
|style="background-color:#000000"|
|colspan=2 |against all
|
|14.29%
|-
| colspan="5" style="background-color:#E9E9E9;"|
|- style="font-weight:bold"
| colspan="3" style="text-align:left;" | Total
| 
| 100%
|-
| colspan="5" style="background-color:#E9E9E9;"|
|- style="font-weight:bold"
| colspan="4" |Source:
|
|}

2000

|-
! colspan=2 style="background-color:#E9E9E9;text-align:left;vertical-align:top;" |Candidate
! style="background-color:#E9E9E9;text-align:left;vertical-align:top;" |Party
! style="background-color:#E9E9E9;text-align:right;" |Votes
! style="background-color:#E9E9E9;text-align:right;" |%
|-
|style="background-color:"|
|align=left|Arkady Baskayev
|align=left|Independent
|
|22.26%
|-
|style="background-color:"|
|align=left|Sergey Baburin
|align=left|Independent
|
|16.99%
|-
|style="background-color:"|
|align=left|Nina Berdnikova
|align=left|Independent
|
|8.83%
|-
|style="background-color:"|
|align=left|Gennady Strekalov
|align=left|Independent
|
|6.89%
|-
|style="background-color:"|
|align=left|Sergey Krivoshein
|align=left|Independent
|
|4.47%
|-
|style="background-color:"|
|align=left|Mikhail Bezrukov
|align=left|Independent
|
|4.33%
|-
|style="background-color:"|
|align=left|Andrey Nechayev
|align=left|Independent
|
|4.28%
|-
|style="background-color:"|
|align=left|Valery Kuznetsov
|align=left|Independent
|
|2.63%
|-
|style="background-color:"|
|align=left|Vladimir Bukin
|align=left|Independent
|
|1.99%
|-
|style="background-color:"|
|align=left|Vladislav Gorokhov
|align=left|Independent
|
|1.87%
|-
|style="background-color:"|
|align=left|Sergey Goranov
|align=left|Independent
|
|1.19%
|-
|style="background-color:"|
|align=left|Konstantin Glodev
|align=left|Independent
|
|0.99%
|-
|style="background-color:"|
|align=left|Vladimir Kostryukov
|align=left|Independent
|
|0.93%
|-
|style="background-color:"|
|align=left|Galina Bozhedomova
|align=left|Independent
|
|0.78%
|-
|style="background-color:"|
|align=left|Valery Kvartalnov
|align=left|Independent
|
|0.71%
|-
|style="background-color:"|
|align=left|Mikhail Zhivilo
|align=left|Independent
|
|0.16%
|-
|style="background-color:"|
|align=left|Yury Zhivilo
|align=left|Independent
|
|0.09%
|-
|style="background-color:#000000"|
|colspan=2 |against all
|
|17.78%
|-
| colspan="5" style="background-color:#E9E9E9;"|
|- style="font-weight:bold"
| colspan="3" style="text-align:left;" | Total
| 
| 100%
|-
| colspan="5" style="background-color:#E9E9E9;"|
|- style="font-weight:bold"
| colspan="4" |Source:
|
|}

2003

|-
! colspan=2 style="background-color:#E9E9E9;text-align:left;vertical-align:top;" |Candidate
! style="background-color:#E9E9E9;text-align:left;vertical-align:top;" |Party
! style="background-color:#E9E9E9;text-align:right;" |Votes
! style="background-color:#E9E9E9;text-align:right;" |%
|-
|style="background-color:#FFD700"|
|align=left|Arkady Baskayev (incumbent)
|align=left|People's Party
|
|30.90%
|-
|style="background-color:"|
|align=left|Vladimir Aristarkhov
|align=left|Independent
|
|14.73%
|-
|style="background:#1042A5"| 
|align=left|Boris Nadezhdin
|align=left|Union of Right Forces
|
|14.62%
|-
|style="background-color:"|
|align=left|Viktor Zorkaltsev
|align=left|Communist Party
|
|9.97%
|-
|style="background-color:"|
|align=left|Valentina Derkach
|align=left|Independent
|
|4.60%
|-
|style="background-color:#164C8C"|
|align=left|Igor Titov
|align=left|United Russian Party Rus'
|
|2.43%
|-
|style="background-color:"|
|align=left|Vitaly Uteshev
|align=left|Liberal Democratic Party
|
|1.96%
|-
|style="background-color:"|
|align=left|Ivan Klimenko
|align=left|Agrarian Party
|
|1.37%
|-
|style="background-color:#000000"|
|colspan=2 |against all
|
|16.81%
|-
| colspan="5" style="background-color:#E9E9E9;"|
|- style="font-weight:bold"
| colspan="3" style="text-align:left;" | Total
| 
| 100%
|-
| colspan="5" style="background-color:#E9E9E9;"|
|- style="font-weight:bold"
| colspan="4" |Source:
|
|}

2016

|-
! colspan=2 style="background-color:#E9E9E9;text-align:left;vertical-align:top;" |Candidate
! style="background-color:#E9E9E9;text-align:left;vertical-align:top;" |Party
! style="background-color:#E9E9E9;text-align:right;" |Votes
! style="background-color:#E9E9E9;text-align:right;" |%
|-
|style="background-color: " |
|align=left|Maksim Surayev
|align=left|United Russia
|
|52.39%
|-
|style="background-color:"|
|align=left|Oksana Krasikova
|align=left|Communist Party
|
|9.47%
|-
|style="background-color:"|
|align=left|Aleksey Mushin
|align=left|Liberal Democratic Party
|
|8.95%
|-
|style="background-color:"|
|align=left|Maksim Soshin
|align=left|A Just Russia
|
|6.53%
|-
|style="background:"| 
|align=left|Natalya Blinova
|align=left|Communists of Russia
|
|5.04%
|-
|style="background-color:"|
|align=left|Dmitry Pavlenok
|align=left|People's Freedom Party
|
|3.63%
|-
|style="background-color:"|
|align=left|Anatoly Batashev
|align=left|The Greens
|
|3.57%
|-
|style="background-color:"|
|align=left|Vyacheslav Pivulsky
|align=left|Party of Growth
|
|3.34%
|-
|style="background-color:"|
|align=left|Margarita Svergunova
|align=left|Rodina
|
|3.09%
|-
| colspan="5" style="background-color:#E9E9E9;"|
|- style="font-weight:bold"
| colspan="3" style="text-align:left;" | Total
| 
| 100%
|-
| colspan="5" style="background-color:#E9E9E9;"|
|- style="font-weight:bold"
| colspan="4" |Source:
|
|}

2021

|-
! colspan=2 style="background-color:#E9E9E9;text-align:left;vertical-align:top;" |Candidate
! style="background-color:#E9E9E9;text-align:left;vertical-align:top;" |Party
! style="background-color:#E9E9E9;text-align:right;" |Votes
! style="background-color:#E9E9E9;text-align:right;" |%
|-
|style="background-color:"|
|align=left|Vyacheslav Fomichyov
|align=left|United Russia
|
|46.15%
|-
|style="background-color:"|
|align=left|Oleg Zverev
|align=left|Communist Party
|
|15.48%
|-
|style="background-color:"|
|align=left|Dmitry Shinkarev
|align=left|A Just Russia — For Truth
|
|11.59%
|-
|style="background-color: "|
|align=left|Yulia Smirnova
|align=left|Party of Pensioners
|
|5.56%
|-
|style="background-color: " |
|align=left|Kleopatra Orlova
|align=left|New People
|
|5.35%
|-
|style="background-color:"|
|align=left|Mikhail Pshennov
|align=left|Liberal Democratic Party
|
|4.69%
|-
|style="background-color:"|
|align=left|Anton Vinogradov
|align=left|Party of Growth
|
|2.85%
|-
|style="background-color:"|
|align=left|Dmitry Polyakov
|align=left|Russian Party of Freedom and Justice
|
|2.37%
|-
|style="background-color:"|
|align=left|Aleksandr Khomazyuk
|align=left|Rodina
|
|1.58%
|-
| colspan="5" style="background-color:#E9E9E9;"|
|- style="font-weight:bold"
| colspan="3" style="text-align:left;" | Total
| 
| 100%
|-
| colspan="5" style="background-color:#E9E9E9;"|
|- style="font-weight:bold"
| colspan="4" |Source:
|
|}

Notes

References

Russian legislative constituencies
Politics of Moscow Oblast